Abbrederis is a surname. Notable people with the surname include:

Jared Abbrederis (born 1990), American football player
Matthäus Abbrederis (1652– 1725), Austrian organist and organ builder